2980 Cameron, provisionally designated , is a main-belt asteroid discovered by prolific American astronomer Schelte Bus at Siding Spring Observatory, Australia, on March 2, 1981. It orbits the Sun every 4.11 years at a distance of 2.1–3.0 AU.

The asteroid was named after astrophysicist and cosmogonist Alastair G. W. Cameron (1925–2005), who was associate director for theoretical astrophysics at the Center for Astrophysics  Harvard & Smithsonian. He was an early advocate of the concepts of a turbulent accretion disk solar nebula, and of the origin of the Moon by a giant impact on the proto-Earth. He also studied the nucleosynthesis in stars and supernovae, and the cosmic abundances of nuclides.

References

External links 
 Dictionary of Minor Planet Names, Google books
 
 

002980
Discoveries by Schelte J. Bus
Named minor planets
19810302